is a Japanese manga series by Yumi Unita. The plot follows thirty-year-old Daikichi as he becomes the guardian of Rin, the illegitimate six-year-old daughter of his grandfather. Bunny Drop was serialized in Shodensha's monthly josei manga magazine Feel Young from October 2005 to April 2011. Its chapters were collected into nine wide-ban volumes by Shodensha. The series has been licensed for English language release by Yen Press.

An anime adaptation by Production I.G was broadcast in Japan between July and September 2011. A live-action film adaptation premiered in August 2011. A spin-off series, titled Usagi Drop: Bangaihen, was serialized in Feel Young from July 2011 to December 2011 and collected in one volume.

Plot
When 30-year-old Daikichi Kawachi returns home for his grandfather's funeral he learns about the existence of Rin Kaga, his grandfather's illegitimate six-year-old daughter by an unknown mother. The girl is an embarrassment to all his relatives and is treated like an outcast.

Annoyed by their attitudes, Daikichi decides to take care of Rin himself, even though he is single and has no experience in raising a child. As Rin becomes part of his life, Daikichi experiences the hardships of being a single parent. He is befriended by the single mother of Kouki Nitani, a young boy who Rin meets in nursery school, who gives him advice on raising Rin. After a year has passed, Daikichi acknowledges his sacrifices for Rin have been worth it. The first half of the series focuses on Daikichi's perspective and struggles raising Rin.

Ten years later, Rin is a high school student and the remainder of the series focuses on her trying to figure out how to deal with her feelings for Kouki, and her decision for a career. Rin discovers that she is not actually related to Daikichi by blood, and the series ends with Rin wanting to have a child with Daikichi.

The anime and live-action adaptations do not depict this revelation, and instead end before the time skip.

Characters

 
 Daikichi is a 30-year-old single man and the adoptive guardian of Rin. With Rin living in his home, Daikichi quits smoking, cleans his house, and reluctantly cuts back on work hours. Despite his irresponsible life style, Daikichi is a very hard worker and considered the best in his department. He is insecure about raising Rin, always asking his co-workers or Yukari for guidance. Yumi Unita stated some events Daikichi faced when raising Rin were based on her personal experiences. It appears that he has romantic feelings for Yukari. He is voiced by Hiroshi Tsuchida in the Japanese dub of the anime, and portrayed by Kenichi Matsuyama in the live action film.
 
 Rin is a six-year-old girl and thought to be the illegitimate daughter of Daikichi's grandfather,  and manga artist . Masako abandoned her for the sake of her career. She is strongly independent and mature, often dealing with issues on her own. Living with Daikichi, she develops a fondness of cooking for him. Rin begins to wrestle with her feelings when Kouki starts wanting to have a deeper relationship with her. Rin comes to realize that she loves Daikichi, but is hesitant to pursue a relationship because they are related. Near the end of the series, however, Rin learns that Daikichi was not her biological father and only adopted her. After this she opts to stay with Daikichi for life and marry him. Her child self is voiced by Ayu Matsuura in the Japanese dub of the anime, and portrayed by Mana Ashida in the live-action film.
 
 Kouki is a boy Rin befriended in her daycare. He is an immature brat, but has grown fond of Rin as they are both raised by a single parent. When they are teenagers, Kouki desires to pursue a deeper relationship with Rin. Kouki later realizes that Rin loves Daikichi and works to help her confess her feelings to him, consistently acting for her best interest despite himself. His child self is voiced by Noa Sakai in the Japanese dub of the anime, and portrayed by Ruiki Satō in the live-action film.
 
 Yukari is an attractive 32-year-old divorced (widowed in the live action film) woman who is Kouki's mother. She gives guidance to Daikichi Kawachi on raising Rin. In the live action film it is said that her husband died in a car accident, which is shown when her son Kouki and Rin went to visit both of their fathers graves at the cemetery. Yukari is voiced by Sayaka Ohara in the Japanese dub of the anime, and portrayed by Karina in the live-action film.

Media

Manga

Bunny Drop was written and illustrated by Yumi Unita. The untitled chapters were serialized by Shodensha in the monthly josei magazine Feel Young between October 2005 and April 2011. Part one, which is collected in the first four volumes, concluded in the April 2008 issue, with part two (which skips ahead ten years) beginning thereafter. The chapters were collected in nine wide-ban volumes, the final volume released on July 8, 2011.
A spin-off series, also by Unita, entitled Usagi Drop: Bangaihen was serialized in Feel Young from July 2011 to December 2011 and collected in one volume.

The series has been licensed in English by Yen Press and in French by Delcourt. Yen Press has published the nine volumes as of August 20, 2013, and the Usagi Drop: Bangaihen volume was released on April 22, 2014 as the tenth and final volume.

Live-action film

In June 2010, production on a live-action film adaption of the manga was announced. The film was directed by Sabu and was released in Japanese theaters on August 20, 2011.

Anime
An anime television series adaptation of the manga produced by Production I.G aired on the noitaminA timeslot on Fuji TV between July 7, 2011 and September 15, 2011. Toho, Fuji TV, SMEJ, Dentsu and Shodensha were also involved in the production of the series. In addition, the series could be watched on Kansai TV (July 13 – September 21), Tokai TV (July 15 – September 23), TV Nishinippon (July 21 – September 22, every two weeks, two episodes per day, last three episodes on September 22), BS Fuji (August 7 – October 23) and Hokkaido Cultural Broadcasting (October 10 - December). The series was also simulcast by Crunchyroll and Anime News Network. The series was released on four Blu-ray Disc/DVD volumes between October 28, 2011 and January 27, 2012, each containing a bonus mini-episode. The opening theme is "Sweet Drop" by Puffy AmiYumi whilst the ending theme is "High High High" by Kasarinchu. The anime has been licensed by NIS America who released the series on Blu-ray and DVD combo pack including an artbook and extras on August 7, 2012.

Episode list

Bonus episodes

Appearances in other media
Rin and Daikichi appear in a downloadable content pack for the PlayStation Vita game Touch My Katamari, which was released in Japan on May 24, 2012.

Reception
About.com's Deb Aoki praised the first volume for its "heartfelt drama and slice-of-life comedy", uncluttered artwork, storytelling, and the relationship between Daikichi and Rin. She notes that the artwork is a bit plain and simple. Danielle Leigh's also praised the art and the parent and child pair, calling the relationship moving and amusing. Comicsworthreading.com's Johanna Carlson commended the realism of Daikichi's character, as if he were an actual Japanese single father. She rated the first volume as one of the best manga of 2010. Carlson expressed appreciation for the small moments where Daikichi learns what it is to be a parent and states the series is unique to the manga market. The manga was a candidate for the 2011 Eisner Award in the Best U.S. Edition of International Material—Asia category.

See also

Sukimasuki, another manga series by the same author

References

External links
 Bunny Drop at Shodensha 
 Bunny Drop at NIS America
 Usagi Drop official anime website 
 Bunny Drop  at Yen Press
 

Anime series based on manga
2011 Japanese television series debuts
2011 Japanese television series endings
Comedy-drama anime and manga
Coming-of-age anime and manga
Josei manga
Noitamina
Production I.G
Shodensha franchises
Shodensha manga
Slice of life anime and manga
Yen Press titles